The Compulsory Wife is a 1937 British comedy film, directed by Arthur B. Woods and starring Henry Kendall and Joyce Kirby.

The film was a quota quickie production with a plot dealing with the farcical complications arising when a pair of strangers have to spend a night alone together in a country cottage when their hosts are detained in town.  Overnight all their luggage is stolen by a burglar, leaving them with nothing but their nightclothes.  Then the next morning their hosts and the other guests start arriving.   It is now classed as a lost film.

Cast
 Henry Kendall'' as Rupert Sinclair
 Joyce Kirby as Bobbie Carr
 George Merritt as Thackeray
 Margaret Yarde as Mrs. Thackeray
 Robert Hale as Craven
 Agnes Lauchlan as Mrs. Craven

References

External links 
 
 The Compulsory Wife at BFI Film & TV Database

1937 films
1937 comedy films
Films directed by Arthur B. Woods
Lost British films
British black-and-white films
British comedy films
1937 lost films
1930s English-language films
Lost comedy films
1930s British films